Fernando Marchiori Lavagnoli (born 19 June 1979), known as Fernando Marchiori, is a Brazilian football manager and former player who played as a midfielder. He is the current manager of ABC.

Career 
Born in São Paulo, Fernando began his career in basic categories of Portuguesa. Started by Juventus, CRB and do Avaí, until you get to Europe. In the old continent, joined in Istres of France. He returned to Brazil in 2003 to serve in the Union Barbarense, where he obtained highlight and was hired in the year following, the Paraná.

In 2005, he returned to Europe to work in Spanish football defending the Córdoba. He returned months later to strengthen the América (SP) in Paulistão 2006, but was little time in club of São Jose do Rio Preto being contracted by Mogi Mirim. Yet passed by Juventude and Rio Branco (SP), until you reach the Adap Galo Maringá where, little time, returned to the pool. In 2008, he returned to Europe to play at Puertollano in Spain.
 
At the end of the year 2008, was incorporated into the cast of San Fernando, where he stopped to play. His career of coach began with stages in Deportivo La Coruña and in Cádiz, both clubs of Spanish football. In Spain he studied and made sure that in the course of monitor of football performed by the Royal Spanish Football Federation. Since 2013, is in Luverdense where first was as an assistant coach and in October 2014, takes over the command of the team. But in the meantime was dismissed, due to recast in the technical commission of the club.

Honours

Player
ECO
 Campeonato Paulista Série B2: 2000
 Campeonato Paulista Série B: 2001

CRB
 Campeonato Alagoano: 2002

Manager 
 Cuiabá
 Copa Verde: 2015
 Campeonato Mato-Grossense: 2015

 Maringá
 Copa Paraná: 2015, 2017
 Campeonato Paranaense Série B: 2017

 Santo André
 Campeonato Paulista Série A2: 2019

 Portuguesa
 Copa Paulista: 2020

References

External links

1979 births
Footballers from São Paulo
Living people
Brazilian footballers
Brazilian football managers
Association football midfielders
Campeonato Brasileiro Série A players
Campeonato Brasileiro Série B players
Campeonato Brasileiro Série C managers
Associação Portuguesa de Desportos players
Clube Atlético Juventus players
Clube de Regatas Brasil players
Avaí FC players
FC Istres players
União Agrícola Barbarense Futebol Clube players
Paraná Clube players
Córdoba CF players
América Futebol Clube (SP) players
Mogi Mirim Esporte Clube players
Rio Branco Esporte Clube players
Adap Galo Maringá Football Club players
CD San Fernando players
CD Puertollano footballers
Cuiabá Esporte Clube managers
Esporte Clube Santo André managers
Esporte Clube Água Santa managers
Associação Portuguesa de Desportos managers
Oeste Futebol Clube managers
ABC Futebol Clube managers